The 2004–05 Argentine Primera B Nacional was the 19th season of second division professional of football in Argentina. A total of 20 teams competed; the champion and runner-up were promoted to Argentine Primera División.

Club information

Torneo Apertura standings

Torneo Clausura standings

Overall standings

Promotion playoff
This leg was played between the Apertura Winner: Gimnasia y Esgrima de Jujuy (J), and the Clausura Winner: Tiro Federal. The winning team was declared champion and was automatically promoted to 2005–06 Primera División and the losing team played the Second Promotion Playoff.

|-
!colspan="5"|Promotion Playoff

Second Promotion Playoff
This leg was played by Gimnasia y Esgrima (J), the losing team of the Promotion Playoff, and Huracán, who was the best team in the overall standings under the champions. The winning team was promoted to 2005–06 Primera División and the losing team played the Promotion Playoff Primera División-Primera B Nacional.

|-
!colspan="5"|Promotion Playoff

Torneo Reducido
It was played by the teams placed 4th, 5th, 6th and 7th in the Overall Standings: CAI (4th), Atlético de Rafaela (5th), Nueva Chicago (6th) and San Martín (M) (7th). The winning team played the Promotion Playoff Primera División-Primera B Nacional.

Semifinals

|-
!colspan="5"|Semifinals

!colspan="5"|Semifinals

Final

|-
!colspan="5"|Final

Promotion playoff Primera División-Primera B Nacional
The Second Promotion playoff loser (Huracán) and the Torneo Reducido Winner (Atlético de Rafaela) played against the 18th and the 17th placed of the Relegation Table of 2004–05 Primera División.

|-
!colspan="5"|Relegation/promotion playoff 1

|-
!colspan="5"|Relegation/promotion playoff 2

|-
|}

 Argentinos Juniors remains in Primera División after winning the playoff.
Instituto  remains in Primera División after winning the playoff.

Relegation

1: Had to play a tiebreaker to see which team played Promotion/relegation Legs.
2: Had to play a tiebreaker to see which team was relegated and which team played Promotion/relegation Legs.
Note: Clubs with indirect affiliation with AFA are relegated to the Torneo Argentino A, while clubs directly affiliated face relegation to Primera B Metropolitana. Clubs with direct affiliation are all from Greater Buenos Aires, with the exception of Newell's, Rosario Central, Central Córdoba and Argentino de Rosario, all from Rosario, and Unión and Colón from Santa Fe.

Tiebreaker 1
Since San Martín (SJ) and Racing (C) finished with the same relegation co-efficient at the dividing line, a one-match playoff was held to determine who had to play in the relegation/promotion playoffs. San Martín (SJ) won the playoff so Racing (C) had to play the Relegation Playoff Matches.

Tiebreaker 2
Since Chacarita Juniors and Defensores de Belgrano finished with the same relegation co-efficient at the dividing line, a one-match playoff was held to determine who had to play in the relegation/promotion playoffs and who had to be directly relegated to the Primera B Metropolitana. Chacarita won the match on penalties and continued to the Relegation Playoff Matches; Defensores de Belgrano was relegated to the Primera B Metropolitana.

Relegation playoff matches

|-
!colspan="5"|Relegation/promotion playoff 1 (Direct affiliation vs. Primera B Metropolitana)

|-
!colspan="5"|Relegation/promotion playoff 2 (Indirect affiliation vs. Torneo Argentino A)

|-
|}

Chacarita Juniors remains in Primera B Nacional after a 2-2 aggregate tie by virtue of a "sports advantage". In case of a tie in goals, the team from the Primera B Nacional gets to stay in it.
Aldosivi was promoted to 2005–06 Primera B Nacional by winning the playoff and Racing (C) was relegated to 2005–06 Torneo Argentino A.

See also
2004–05 in Argentine football

References

External links

Primera B Nacional seasons
2004–05 in Argentine football leagues